Caddle Creek is a  long 2nd order tributary to the Ararat River in Surry County, North Carolina.

Variant names
According to the Geographic Names Information System, it has also been known historically as:
Cadel Creek
Cadels Creek

Course
Caddle Creek rises on the Fisher River divide about 0.5 miles east of Turner Mountain.  Caddle Creek then flows east-northeast to join the Ararat River about 2 miles southeast of White Plains, North Carolina.

Watershed
Caddle Creek drains  of area, receives about 47.8 in/year of precipitation, has a wetness index of 316.91, and is about 51% forested.

See also
List of rivers of North Carolina

References

Rivers of North Carolina
Rivers of Surry County, North Carolina